Podenzano is a  in the Province of Piacenza, Emilia-Romagna, northern  Italy.

It is bordered by the following municipalities: Gossolengo, Piacenza, Pontenure, Rivergaro, San Giorgio Piacentino, Vigolzone.

The patron saint is San Giovanni Bosco. The main parish church is San Germano e San Giovanni Bosco.

Twin towns
Podenzano is twinned with:

  Hajdúdorog, Hungary
  Kanibonzon, Mali

See also
San Polo, Podenzano

References

Cities and towns in Emilia-Romagna